Down Another Road is an album by composer/bassist Graham Collier recorded in 1969 and originally released on the British Fontana label.

Reception

Allmusic said "Collier is an original writer. His works are generally tonally centered and contain melody, but he encourages collective improvisation and stretched harmonies. His pieces carefully balance emotional depth and intellectual rigor, with wonderful harmonies and consistently high levels of performance. This one hits the mark with its carefully constructed compositions and magnificent improvisations". On All About Jazz Nic Jones noted "Collier's working methods, even at this relatively early stage of his career, already had something distinctive about them, and he was blessed in enjoying the services of musicians capable of bringing his ideas to fruition".

Track listing
All compositions by Graham Collier except where noted.

 "Down Another Road" – 5:09
 "Danish Blue" – 17:30
 "The Barley Mow" – 5:30
 "Aberdeen Angus" – 6:02
 "Lullaby for a Lonely Child" (Karl Jenkins) – 5:35
 "Molewrench" – 8:54

Personnel
Graham Collier – bass
Harry Beckett – flugelhorn
Nick Evans – trombone
Stan Sulzmann – alto saxophone, tenor saxophone
Karl Jenkins – piano, oboe
John Marshall – drums

References

1969 albums
Graham Collier albums
Albums produced by Terry Brown (record producer)
Fontana Records albums